"Dia Dia Dia" is a song performed by singer Fatin Shidqia. It is her second single  and featured on her debut album titled For You was released in November 2013. The single was released in Indonesia on 7 November 2013. This single was released with music video on YouTube. The song also became a part of Cinta album by various Indonesian singer in February 2014.

Music videos

On 15 October 2013, Fatin says that she finished filmed her new music video. That music video filmed in Vienna, Austria and Paris, France. Fatin filmed this music video coincide with filmed 99 Cahaya di Langit Eropa, which she as special appearance.
Fatin says that this song is about someone to be abandoned her lover.

Live performances

On 16 November 2013, Fatin sing "Dia Dia Dia" live for first time on Dahsyat. Fatin also sing the song on her many live performances and off air.

Track listing
Digital download
 Dia Dia Dia - 4:23

Awards and Nominations

Charts

Weekly Charts

References

External links
 Lyrics Dia Dia Dia by Fatin Shidqia

2013 singles
2013 songs
Sony Music singles